Jameela albiplaga is a butterfly in the family Lycaenidae. It is found in New Guinea and the Bismarck Archipelago.

References

Butterflies described in 1963
Polyommatini